Memorial Union Building may refer to:
 Memorial Union Building (MTU), Michigan Technological University
 Memorial Union Building (New Hampshire), University of New Hampshire

See also
Memorial Union (disambiguation)